A battering ram is a siege engine originating in ancient times.

Battering Ram may also refer to:
 Battering Ram (comics), a fictional mutant in the Marvel Universe
 Battering Ram (Iron Savior album), a 2004 album by the German power metal band Iron Savior
 Battering Ram (Saxon album), a 2015 album by the English heavy metal band Saxon